Nenad Puljezević (born 13 March 1973) is a Serbian-Hungarian former handball player.

Club career
Puljezević made his professional debut with Crvena zvezda and spent two seasons with the club (1992–1994). He would also play for two years at Partizan (1994–1996), before returning to Crvena zvezda for another two seasons (1996–1998). Between 1998 and 2002, Puljezević played with Lovćen, helping the club win back-to-back championships in 2000 and 2001.

In 2002, Puljezević moved abroad to Hungary and joined Pick Szeged, spending the next seven years with the club. He subsequently returned to his homeland and briefly played for Kolubara. In late 2009, Puljezević moved to Germany and joined TSV Hannover-Burgdorf. He decided to retire after the 2012–13 season. However, Puljezević came out of retirement and signed with TV Hüttenberg in April 2014.

International career
Puljezević represented FR Yugoslavia in two major tournaments, winning the bronze medal at the 2001 World Championship. He later switched allegiance to Hungary and appeared in two more World Championships (2007 and 2009) and two European Championships (2008 and 2010).

Honours
Partizan
 Handball Championship of FR Yugoslavia: 1994–95
Crvena zvezda
 Handball Championship of FR Yugoslavia: 1996–97, 1997–98
Lovćen
 Handball Championship of FR Yugoslavia: 1999–2000, 2000–01
 Handball Cup of FR Yugoslavia: 2001–02
Pick Szeged
 Nemzeti Bajnokság I: 2006–07
 Magyar Kupa: 2005–06, 2007–08
Kadetten Schaffhausen
 Swiss Handball League: 2014–15

References

External links
 MKSZ record
 

1973 births
Living people
Handball players from Belgrade
Naturalized citizens of Hungary
Serbian male handball players
Hungarian male handball players
RK Crvena zvezda players
RK Partizan players
SC Pick Szeged players
RK Kolubara players
Handball-Bundesliga players
Expatriate handball players
Serbian expatriate sportspeople in Hungary
Serbian expatriate sportspeople in Germany
Serbian expatriate sportspeople in Switzerland